The 2011 Louisiana gubernatorial election was held on October 22 with 10 candidates competing in a nonpartisan blanket primary. Incumbent Republican Bobby Jindal was elected to a second term as governor of Louisiana. Since he received an outright majority of the vote in the blanket primary, a runoff election that would have occurred on November 19 was unnecessary. , this was the last time a Republican was elected Governor of Louisiana and the last time the winning candidate won every single parish in a statewide election.

Background
Elections in Louisiana, with the exception of U.S. presidential elections (and congressional races beginning in 2008 and ending after the 2010 midterm election), follow a variation of the open primary system called the jungle primary. Candidates of any and all parties are listed on one ballot; voters need not limit themselves to the candidates of one party. Unless one candidate takes more than 50% of the vote in the first round, a run-off election is then held between the top two candidates, who may in fact be members of the same party. This scenario occurred in the 7th District congressional race in 1996, when Democrats Chris John and Hunter Lundy made the runoff for the open seat, and in 1999, when Republicans Suzanne Haik Terrell and Woody Jenkins made the runoff for Commissioner of Elections.

Candidates
On December 10, 2008, Jindal indicated that he would not run for president in 2012, saying he would focus on his reelection and that this would make transitioning to a national campaign difficult, though he later attempted to leave himself the opportunity to change his mind in the future.

Minister Dan Northcutt (I) was the only declared challenger to Jindal, but he eventually dropped out of the race. On October 22, Caroline Fayard's name surfaced on talk-radio program Think Tank with Garland Robinette, as a potential competitor for Jindal in his reelection campaign. The discussants cited Jindal's high approval ratings and already in-the-bank $7 million campaign fund as unapproachable assets for Democrats other than Fayard, who at the time of the program was seeking the office of lieutenant governor in a special election runoff against Republican secretary of state Jay Dardenne.

Republicans
 Bobby Jindal, incumbent Governor

Democrats

Announced 
 Cary Deaton, attorney
 Tara Hollis, special education teacher
 Androniki "Niki Bird" Papazoglakis, director for Baton Rouge-based victim advocacy group
 Ivo "Trey" Roberts, high school teacher

Declined 
 Al Ater, former Louisiana secretary of state
 Kathleen Blanco, former governor
 Caroline Fayard, attorney and 2010 Democratic nominee for lieutenant governor of Louisiana
 John Georges, businessman, 2007 Independent candidate for governor, unsuccessful candidate for Mayor of New Orleans in 2010
 Robert M. Marionneaux, state senator

Ineligible
 Edwin Edwards, former four-term governor. Wanted to contest election following 10-year prison term for racketeering and illegally selling casino licenses, but was not pardoned

Libertarian
 Scott Lewis, former candidate for Louisiana secretary of state

Independents
 David Blanchard, former employee of the Louisiana Department of Health and Hospitals
 Leonard "Lenny" Bollingham, Computer Engineer & Businessman
 Ron Caesar
 William Robert "Bob" Lang, unsuccessful candidate for the U.S. Senate in 2010

Dropped out 
 Dan Northcutt, minister

General election

Predictions

Results

See also
United States gubernatorial elections, 2011
Governors of Louisiana

References

External links
Candidates
Tara Hollis for Governor 
Bobby Jindal for Governor 

Information
Elections Division at the Louisiana Secretary of State
Louisiana gubernatorial election, 2011 at Ballotpedia
Louisiana Governor Candidates at Project Vote Smart
Campaign contributions for 2011 Louisiana Governor from Follow the Money
Louisiana Governor 2011 from OurCampaigns.com

Governor
2011
2011 United States gubernatorial elections
November 2011 events in the United States